Ocean Ave. is a Swedish-American low budget daytime soap opera, produced by the Swedish production company, Kajak, and filmed at the Florida-based, Dolphin Entertainment. It was set and filmed in Miami, Florida between 2002 and 2003. The series was made for Swedish TV4 where it was moved from early prime time to middays due to bad ratings. No American or international network or channel picked up the series. The main cast included only five Swedish actors, four other Swedish actors were seen in minor roles. Dialogues were shot in both Swedish and English with hopes to sell the series internationally. One hundred and thirty episodes were filmed (60 minutes each, including commercials) but TV4 cut it into 260 episodes (30 minutes each, including commercials). Ocean Ave. received bad reviews from the start.

Plot
Soap opera actor Timothy Adams plays cop Thomas "Thom" O'Keefe, who is working on the case of a prostitute-murdering serial killer. Thom's father, the police commissioner, Jamie O'Keefe (Marc Macaulay), has been involved in other illegal activities for years. When Thom finds out about his father criminal life, he flips out and tries to kill Roberto Rendon, but everything goes wrong and Thom is shot by Manny Ortega. At the hospital, Thom forgives his mother who left him when he was a child, and he begs Sage to promise that she will leave Macy. Thom then dies. Sage follows through with her promise. She divorces Macy, but helps him to escape from the Russians, Vladimir (Angelo Fierro) and Vega, who are after him for not paying them the money he owes. In the last episode, Sage marries Thom, who mysteriously comes back to life.

It is found later that the psychopath, Manny Ortega, has killed countless people. One of them, Stefan Eriksson, was shot to death in front of his dear son Alex, who blacked out and can not remember the murderer because of amnesia. Alex finally regains his memory and recognizes Manny as his father's killer. Manny then confesses in front of Alex and Elena and tells them he is also behind the explosion at Dev Tech, in Sweden. It is there that Nora, the mother of Chrissy and Alex, died. Manny's plan was to kill Stefan, but he survived until he shot him. Manny also tells Alex and Elena that he was the man who raped Elena's mother, Alicia, and that he then strangled her and planted her car in the water so it looked like she drowned in a car accident. Manny probably strangled Hadley Marx as well, but he never confesses to it. Manny is finally shot to death by his own son, Jimmy Ray, who was sent by Roberto.

The journalist, Crystal Tate (Victoria Jackson), starts her own investigation and finds out many dark secrets about the Devon, O'Keefe, Hamilton, and Rendon families. The secrets date back to 1977 and have to do with the death of bordello girl Jazz De Guise (Heidi Mark). Everybody thinks that Jazz died of a drug overdose but Crystal convinces the police to reopen the Jazz case and the question "Who killed Jazz?" makes the Devons and O'Keefes very nervous.

Later in the series, the Swedish model and actress, Victoria Silvstedt, appears in a few episodes in hopes to boost the ratings. She played a sexy detective sent to Miami to help the police with the serial killer case, but she soon falls victim to the killer herself.

Cast
 Steve DuMouchel as Martin Devon
 Leigh Lombardi as Anne Devon
 Jean Carol as Catherine Devon
 Tony Templeton as Macy Devon
 Kristy Eisenberg as Sage Devon-O'Keefe
 Timothy Adams as Thomas "Thom" O'Keefe
 Matthew McKerrow as Ian Blake/Cameron Ramsey
 Megan Fox as Ione Starr
 Rebecca Ferguson as Chrissy Eriksson
 Marc Menard as Lucas Devon
 Natalie Khoury as Gabriella "Gaby" Hamilton
 Victoria Jackson as Crystal Tate
 Petrus Antonius as Antonio "Tony" Avanti
 Pa Neumüller as Charlotta Eriksson
 Justin Gorence as Dr. Will O'Keefe
 Lyn Foley as Lorraine O'Keefe, aka Teri Martin
 Marc Macaulay as Jamie O'Keefe
 Robert Emmett Fitzsimmons as Mike Moran
 Francisco Paz as Manny Ortega
 Carlos Iglesias as Jimmy Ray Ortega
 Antoni Corone as Roberto Rendon
 Denise DeQuevedo as Elena Rendon
 Marcus Larsson as Alex Eriksson
 Edward Finlay as Dylan O'Keefe
 Nicole Rawlins as Kayla McDermott
 Jessica Sutta as Jody Starr
 Michael Sarysz as Raider Howarth
 Candace Kroslak as Lindy Maddux
 Gwendolyn Osborne as Jade Dominguez
 Michael Anderson as Marco Jones
 Ken Clement as Harry Sowalski
 Brian Baer as Davey Lapin
 Jan Waldekranz as Stefan Eriksson
 Jacqueline Ramel as Nora Eriksson
 Sean Sullivan as Josh Mandell

Minor roles
 Sarah-Elizabeth Walk as Model Mandy
 Bart Baldwin as Bobby Devon
 Martin Forsström as Nils Thurmond
 Wayne Farnes as P.I. Paterson
 Thatcher Stevens as Vincent
 Miriam Salazar as Julianna Ortega
 Peter Haig as Trebly
 Andrea Abenoza as Hadley Marx
 Susanne Krietman Taylor as Dr. Martha Kurtz
 Eric Anderson as Torrance Jones
 Angel Schmiedt as Arlette Kelly-Jones
 Kimona Ryan as Jewel Starr
 Arielle Quatro as Tasha James
 Will McClain as Jordan Matthews
 Sean Dennison as Mr. Steve Ryan
 Linda L. Miller as Lisa Maddux
 Billy Kelly as Matt Baxter
 Francois Boulaire as Louis

Guest roles
 Justine Eyre as Karen
 Brooke Leslie Reid as Regina
 Raul Roman as Coach Perez
 Mario Ingoglia as Janitor
 Michele Lepe as Denise
 Todd Nasca as Jake
 Irene B. Colletti as Joan
 Lee Perkins as Detective Sanders
 Linda Batista as Daniella
 Chanin Owens as Ally/Misty
 Roxie Stice as Louise
 Dave Corey as Dr. Jaspers
 Chris Charles Herbert as Michael Layton
 Krizia Bajos as Noelle
 Magda Hernandez as Alicia Rendon
 Heidi Mark as Jazz De Guise
 Nick Ondarza as Ramon Vega
 Kalex as Armand Vega
 Angelo Fierro as Vladimir
 Marjorie Manushaw as Kayla's Grandmother
 Tina Harbom as Eva Olin
 Victoria Silvstedt as Detective Johanna Marsden
 Erin Plewes as Jessica
 Monika Kramlik as Nadine Royal
 Sally Boni as Lauren Ramsey
 Vivian Ruiz as Margaret

External links

2002 American television series debuts
2003 American television series endings
Swedish television soap operas
Television shows set in Miami
TV4 (Sweden) original programming